Verbascum cystolithicum is a species of flowers in the family Scrophulariaceae.  The species is endemic to Cape Verde. The species was first described in 1960 by Bror Johan Petterson, who placed it in the genus Celsia. Arthur Huber-Morath placed it in the Verbascum species in 1973. Its local name is mato-branco, which may also refer to two other plants.

Verbascum cystolithicum is only found in the mountainous area of the island of Fogo, above 1300 m elevation.

References

cystolithicum
Flora of Fogo, Cape Verde
Mosteiros, Cape Verde
Santa Catarina do Fogo
Endemic flora of Cape Verde